Jean Allaire (born 1930) was the author of the Allaire Report, and subsequently in 1994 the first leader of the fiscally conservative, autonomist provincial level political party in Quebec, the Action démocratique du Québec (ADQ). Allaire resigned within a few months for health reasons and was succeeded by Mario Dumont.

Prior to joining the ADQ, Allaire was an influential member of the Quebec Liberal Party. He and Mario Dumont, organized a group a Liberal dissidents called the Network of Liberals for the No, that campaigned against the Charlottetown Accord.

This faction was disillusioned with the Liberals's stance on Canadian federalism and became the base of the ADQ.

In April 2007, Allaire signed a manifesto that urges Quebec to choose an electoral system in which a significant number of seats would be determined by proportional representation instead of plurality.

In 2012, he was a member of the Coalition Avenir Québec (CAQ) after the ADQ merged with the CAQ.

Footnotes

1930 births
Living people
Lawyers in Quebec
Quebec political party leaders
French Quebecers
Coalition Avenir Québec politicians
21st-century Canadian politicians
Canadian political party founders
Action démocratique du Québec politicians